Oenomaus griseus is a species of butterfly of the family Lycaenidae. It is found on the central plateau of Brazil.

References

Butterflies described in 2008
Eumaeini